Splinters from an Ever-Changing Face is the debut studio album by American hardcore punk band End, which was released on June 5, 2020, through Closed Casket Activities. The album was recorded and produced in the Graphic Nature Audio studio by member Will Putney.

Release
In early 2020, drummer Andrew McEnaney departed the band, and was replaced by ex-the Dillinger Escape Plan drummer Billy Rymer
On March 26, 2020, the band released the new single, "Pariah", and announced their debut album "Splinters from an Ever-Changing Face" would be released through Closed Casket Activities. They released 3 more singles from the album, which were "Covet Not" on April 23, 2020, "Fear for Me Now" on May 14, 2020, and "Hesitation Wounds" on June 4, 2020. The next day, on June 5, 2020, they released their debut album, "Splinters from an Ever-Changing Face".

Reception

The album has received positive reviews.

Musical style
The album has been described as metalcore and hardcore punk, with mathcore and black metal influences, with Paul travers of Kerrang! saying "It’s a relentless album that turns vicious ugliness into something quite beautiful". while Adam Rees of New Noise Magazine said the album "is a debilitating hardcore onslaught".

Track listing

Personnel
END
Brendan Murphy – vocals
Will Putney – guitar
Gregory Thomas – guitar
Jay Pepito – bass
Billy Rymer - drums

Production
Will Putney – production, engineering, mixing, mastering

Additional personnel
Adam Burke - artwork
Steve Seid - engineer

References

External links
Splinters from an Ever-Changing Face on Bandcamp

2020 debut albums
Albums produced by Will Putney